Cirque du Soleil: Fire Within is a 2002 Canadian reality television mini-series. The series follows eight Cirque du Soleil performers during the creation and production of the Cirque's touring production, Varekai. Stress ensues as several newcomers try to learn new acrobatic acts for the show, while the subplot also follows the crew behind the show trying to cast new performers, advertise the production, create the stage set, costumes, and make-up, and manage the show under the direction of newcomer Dominic Champagne.

Fire Within originally aired in thirteen 23-minute episodes weekly between the course of September 16 and December 9, 2002 on Bravo. The miniseries was filmed primarily in Montréal, largely at the Cirque du Soleil headquarters and the Old Port of Montréal, as well as New York, Dallas, London, Paris, and Sofia.

Cast
Fire Within maintained an ensemble cast of performers chosen to be a part of the original cast of Varekai. The camera crew documented not only these performers' work during production of the show, but also their personal lives which often got in the way of their work. The performers came from a variety of different backgrounds, some experienced Cirque du Soleil performers.
 Oleg Ouchakov – a Cirque du Soleil veteran who joins the cast of Varekai to develop an acrobatic pas de deux with his dance partner, Tatiana.
 Stella Umeh – an Olympic gymnast who joins the cast to perform in the triple trapeze, an act in which she is inexperienced.
 Olga Pikhienko – a young contortionist who leaves Quidam to become a lead in Varekai.
 Raquel Karro Oliveira – a skilled trapeze artist who is part of the triple-trapeze act with Stella.
 Ashley Beaver – an acrobat who arrives to Cirque as a newcomer with his acrobatic partner Gareth to develop an Icarian games act.
 Gareth Hopkins – an acrobat and Cirque du Soleil newcomer who arrives along with his acrobatic partner Ashley to develop an Icarian games act as well as the character of the "Lizard".
 Andrew and Kevin Atherton – identical twin brothers who develop an aerial straps act for the show, as well as participate in much of the show's promotion.

Recurring cast
Many artists and crew behind the production are featured  throughout the mini-series.
 Adrian Berinde — a Romanian singer hired as a primary singer, only to be laid off ten days before the premiere, having had difficulty settling into a role.
 Dominic Champagne — Varekai'''s director and Cirque du Soleil newcomer.
 Louise Mercier — head of the Cirque du Soleil marketing department.
 Adrian Porter — Gareth and Ashley's acrobatic coach.
 Boris Verkhovsky — Varekai's primary acrobatic coach.
 Michel Laprise — a talent scout for Varekai.

Broadcast historyFire Within consists of thirteen half-hour episodes with commercials, originally premiering in the United States on Bravo in September 2002. The episodes were aired in the intended order weekly until December 2002 with the conclusion of the mini-series. A 23-minute cast reunion special was released on November 2, 2004 on the DVD release.

Special

ReceptionFire Within'' received positive reviews. Virginia Heffernan of Slate and Tim Goodman of SFGate both gave the series positive reviews.

Accolades
The mini-series won the 55th Primetime Emmy Award for Outstanding Nonfiction Program (Alternative), as well as two Gemini Awards.

References

External links
 
 
 Playbill preview, January 2, 2003
 DVD Verdict review, January 18, 2005

Cirque du Soleil
2000s Canadian reality television series
Circus television shows
Emmy Award-winning programs
English-language television shows
French-language television shows
Global Television Network original programming
2002 Canadian television series debuts
2002 Canadian television series endings
Gemini and Canadian Screen Award for Best Reality Series winners